Lize Shangwuqu station is a station on Lines 14, 16 and Daxing Airport Express of the Beijing Subway in Fengtai District.

Opening time
Line 14 (Middle section): December 31, 2021

Line 16 (Southern section): Expected to open in 2023

Daxing Airport Express (Northern extension): Expected to open in 2023

Location
The station, located outside the Southwest 2nd Ring Road, is being built at the intersection of the east-west Lize Road, which Line 14 will run parallel to, and the north-south Xiquxueyuan Road, which Line 16 will run parallel to. Both roads are under construction in the station's vicinity.

Station Layout 
Both the line 14 and line 16 stations have underground island platforms. The Daxing Airport Express station features a city terminal which provides in-town check-in and baggage drop services.

References

Beijing Subway stations in Fengtai District